The 1924 Gonzaga Bulldogs football team was an American football team that represented Gonzaga University during the 1924 college football season. In their fifth and final year under head coach Gus Dorais, the Bulldogs compiled a 5–0–2 record, shut out five of seven opponents, and outscored all opponents by a total of 138 to 26.

Four of the 11 starters on the 1924 Gonzaga team went on to play in the National Football League: left halfback Hust Stockton (1925–29); end Ray Flaherty (1926–1935); tackle Tiny Cahoon (1926–1929); and guard Hector Cyre (1926–1928).

Dorais left Gonzaga after the 1924 season to become head football coach at the University of Detroit.

Schedule

References

Gonzaga
Gonzaga Bulldogs football seasons
College football undefeated seasons
Gonzaga Bulldogs football